Yellow-spotted emerald may refer to:

 Somatochlora flavomaculata, a species of dragonfly in the family Corduliidae, common in northern Europe from France through to Siberia and Mongolia
 Hemicordulia intermedia, a species of dragonfly in the family Corduliidae, found across northern Australia

Animal common name disambiguation pages